Curtis or Curtiss is a given name and surname.

Curtis or Curtiss may also refer to:

Places

United States 
 Curtis, Alabama, an unincorporated community
 Curtis, Arkansas, an unincorporated community
 Curtis, Florida, an unincorporated community in Gilchrist County, Florida
 Curtis, Illinois, an unincorporated community
 Curtis, Michigan, an unincorporated community in Portage Township, Mackinac County, Michigan
 Curtis Township, Michigan, a civil township in Alcona County, Michigan; includes Curtisville
 Curtis, Nebraska, a city in Frontier County, Nebraska
 Curtis, Washington,  an unincorporated community in Washington

Elsewhere 
 Curtis (crater), formerly designated "Picard Z", a very small lunar crater in the western Mare Crisium
 Curtis, Spain, a municipality in the Province of A Coruña in the autonomous community of Galicia

Companies

Curtis 
 Curtis Publishing Company, American publisher
 Curtis Computer Products, American manufacturer of computer cables, accessories, and peripherals

Curtiss 
 Curtiss Aeroplane and Motor Company, a former American aircraft manufacturer, among the companies that in 1929 merged to form Curtiss-Wright
 Curtiss Candy Company, a former American candy company, purchased by Nestlé in 1990
 Curtiss-Wright, an American manufacturer of aviation components, formerly a leading aircraft manufacturer

Music
 Curtis (50 Cent album), a 2007 album by American rapper 50 Cent
 Curtis (Curtis Mayfield album), a 1970 album by American soul/funk artist Curtis Mayfield
 Curtis Institute of Music, an American conservatory located in Philadelphia, Pennsylvania

Other uses
 Curtis (comic strip), an American comic strip syndicated by King Features, created and illustrated by Ray Billingsley
 Curtis Cup, an Anglo-American trophy for women amateur golfers
 curtis, a type of medieval estate, for which see Notitia de actoribus regis

See also
 Justice Curtis (disambiguation)